Nannapaneni Rajakumari is an Indian politician and ex-chairwoman of AP state Women's Commission and Telugu Desam Party (TDP) leader. She is an official spokesperson for the TDP.

Political career
She entered politics when the actor N. T. Rama Rao started the Telugu Desam party.  Rajakumari was elected as MLA to Andhra Pradesh Assembly on two occasions, from Sattenapalli (1983–1985) and Vinukonda (1989–1994). She worked as minister for Cultural affairs and Tourism in Nadendla Bhaskara Rao's government.

She was the first women to ever become chief whip in India during the N. Janardhana Reddy and Dr. Chenna Reddy regimes.  She also worked President of Andhra Pradesh State Mahila Congress.  Rajakumari also held president of Telugu Mahila, women wing of Telugu Desam party.

Rajakumari declared she would be on a fast-unto-death from 20 December 2009 against the bifurcation of AndhraPradesh state with pressure from some groups from Telegana. Federal Government announced on 9 December 2009 that process of bifurcation process will begin and later clarified on 23 December the process will begin only after wide consultation with groups from all regions of the state. Rajakumari called off her strike after this announcement from the federal government.

Rajakumari wrote several novels, most famous one include 'Nannapaneni Navarathnalu 'series of 9 novels.  Her interest in singing and writing is well known.  She was good painter as well. Rajakumari spoke on All India Radio (AIR) on 97 prime time occasions on different issues of public interest.

Films
She plays the role as a justice in Taraka Ratna's Vijetha film.

References

External links 
 ABN Insider interview with Nannapaneni
 Nannapaneni demands action against DGP
 Nannapaneni injured in ‘attack’
 Nannapaneni slams YSR
 Nannapaneni’s agony unheard

Living people
Telugu politicians
Telugu Desam Party politicians
Andhra Pradesh MLAs 1989–1994
Members of the Andhra Pradesh Legislative Council
People from Guntur district
Women in Andhra Pradesh politics
Andhra Pradesh MLAs 1983–1985
20th-century Indian women politicians
20th-century Indian politicians
21st-century Indian women politicians
21st-century Indian politicians
1948 births